Lahat Regency is a regency of South Sumatra (or Sumatra Selatan) province, Indonesia. It covers a total area of 4,361.83 km2 and had a population of 369,974 at the 2010 Census and 430,071 at the 2020 Census. The city of Pagar Alam is an enclave within the regency, but is administratively separate.

The administrative centre of Lahat regency is the town of Lahat.

Administrative districts 

This Regency as at 2010 was administratively composed of twenty-one districts (kecamatan). Since 2010 three additional districts have been created - Sukamerindu (from part of Pajar Bulan District), Lahat Selatan (from Lahat District) and Mulak Sebingkai (from Mulak Ulu District). Their areas (in km2) and their populations at the 2010 and 2020 Censuses are listed below. The table also includes the locations of the district administrative centres, the number of administrative villages (rural desa and urban kelurahan) in each district, and its post codes.

Notes: (a) The districts of Tanjung Sakti Pumu and Tanjung Sakti Pumi form an exclave of the regency, from which they are physically separated by the city (kota) of Pagar Alam.
(b) The 2010 population of Mulak Sebingkai District is included in the figure for Mulak Ulu District from which it was cut out.
(c)  The 2010 population of Sukamerindu District is included in the figure for Pajar Bulan District, from which it was cut out.
(d) The 2010 population of Lahat Selatan District is included in the figure for Lahat District, from which it was cut out.

Megalithic sites
In Lahat Regency, near Pagar Alam city, there are 1,027 artifacts which spread over 40 sites in 12 communities. The megalithic sites in Lahat Regency may be the second largest such sites in Indonesia after Sangiran (Central Java) for fossils.

References

External links
 
 Map of South Sumatra province

Regencies of South Sumatra